The first series of Dancing with the Stars premiered on 1 May 2005. The viewership hit around 730,000 and almost a million tuned into the final episode. It was won by Norm Hewitt and his partner Carol-Ann Hickmore, with 62.42% of the public vote. Shane Cortese placed second with 37.58%. In the semi-finals it was even closer with Norm Hewitt winning 42.81% and Shane winning 36.71% of the public vote.  According to a TVNZ spokeswoman, 317,698 votes were cast for the final, of which 83,000 were 0900 calls, and the rest text messages. The series earned charities a combined total of more than $444,000, according to TVNZ.

Contestants

Elimination
Red numbers indicate the couples with the lowest score for each week.
Green numbers indicate the couples with the highest score for each week.
 indicates the couples eliminated that week.
 indicates the returning couple that finished in the bottom two.
 indicates the winning couple.
 indicates the runner-up couple.

Dance chart
 Highest Scoring Dance
 Lowest Scoring Dance

Average chart

References

series 1
2005 New Zealand television seasons